Animax is the pay television channel in Asia owned by KC Global Media Asia which broadcasts Japanese language anime and Simulcast anime, anime programming through English-language feeds in Southeast Asia (excluding Brunei), South and East Asia. It is the first television channel in Asia dedicated to anime, and was initially launched in Hong Kong, and Southeast Asia in January 2004,

Animax cooperate the distributors to acquire content popular anime series such as Muse Communication, Medialink, Mighty Media, Odex, Crunchyroll and more.  

The channel was formerly owned by Sony Pictures Entertainment, but was sold to KC Global Media on January 1, 2020.

History
On December 17, 2015, Animax Asia announced that it will begin broadcasting in high definition (HD), with high definition channel will be a simulcast with its standard definition (SD) channel, carrying the same content.

Hong Kong
Animax first launched in Hong Kong on 11 January 2004. It broadcasts a variety of anime programming, from old to modern television series. Animax also airs anime series that premiered in Hong Kong prior to their release in Southeast Asian networks, some of them are Death Note, Blood+, Trinity Blood and Mushishi. After the TV premiere of Gurren Lagann, Animax's TV ratings recorded a huge increase and moved 80% more TRP than its closest competitor, Cartoon Network Asia.

Southeast Asia
A week after its launch in Hong Kong, Animax was launched in Southeast Asia on 19 January 2004, initially featuring its anime programming exclusively in the original Japanese audio with English subtitling, becoming the company's first English language network. It also later incorporated an English audio dub feed.

Programming blocks seen include "Ani-Chan", which is aired on weekdays at 4:00 pm to 6:00 pm (featuring shows such as Naruto, Danball Senki (a.k.a. Little Battlers eXperience) and Tsubasa Chronicle); "Animania", which is aired on weekdays from 6:00 pm and 6:30 pm (featuring the Dragon Ball franchise and Law of Ueki); "Mega Zone", its prime time programming block is aired on weekdays from 7:00 pm; and its weekend programming block aired every Sunday at 9:00 pm and 10:00 pm.

On July 5, 2013, Animax was forced to close down in Vietnam due to government content restrictions, but after 7 years, on 1 April 2020, it was relaunched on VTVCab.

Malaysia
Astro had been broadcasting the channel since 31 August 2006. The channel ceased transmission on January 1, 2022; however selected anime series broadcast by Animax is still made available on Astro's Video-on-Demand platform and Astro GO.

Unifi TV has rebroadcast Animax since 1 June 2017 along with Sony Channel. They initially ceased its transmission of the channel on 1 July 2020, but would resume on 1 October 2021 along with introduction of AXN & GEM, two other channels owned by KC Global Media Asia.

South Asia

Bangladesh 
Animax India was formerly provided in Bangladesh. It was later banned for unknown reasons, but in October 2021, the Asian feed of Animax began to be provided to Bangladeshi audiences.

India

On 18 April 2017, Animax India ceased broadcasting in India, with Sony Yay ultimately replacing the network. Sony would later make the Asian feed of Animax available on its Indian digital platform, Sony LIV, until 8 May 2020, when several Sony-owned networks were acquired by KC earlier that week. On 20 January 2023, Animax Asia started broadcasting in India exclusively via the streaming platform, JioTV.

See also

List of programs broadcast by Animax
Animax India
Animax (South Korean TV Channel) 
Animax Asia (Taiwan)

References

External links

Animax Taiwan official website

Animax
Television channels and stations established in 2004
Defunct mass media in Malaysia
Children's television networks